Simon Hammersley (born 20 March 1993) is a former English rugby union player who played as a fullback. He has been nicknamed "Lord Hammer of Hammershire" by BT Sport commentator Nick Mullins.

Club career
Hammersley started his career at his local amateur club Hull Ionians in National League 2 North, before attending Durham University where he was part of the team who won the BUCS national final at Twickenham. 

Hammersley signed with Newcastle Falcons in summer 2013 and quickly established himself as a first team player, aided by injury to the regular starting full back Alex Tait. He was called into the England Saxons squad as injury cover in August 2016 

Following Newcastle's relegation to the RFU Championship, Hammersley invoked a relegation release clause in his contract that would allow him to leave the club should such a situation occur. It was announced shortly afterwards that Sale Sharks had signed a three-year deal with the fullback, a move which would keep him in the Premiership.

In May 2022, Hammersley announced his retirement from professional rugby in order to a pursue a career outside the sport.

References

External links
ESPN profile

1993 births
Living people
Newcastle Falcons players
Sale Sharks players
English rugby union players
Rugby union players from Kingston upon Hull
Rugby union fullbacks
Durham University RFC players
Alumni of the College of St Hild and St Bede, Durham